The Tayside and Central Regional Transport Partnership (Tactran) is the statutory Regional Transport Partnership covering the Angus, Dundee City, Perth & Kinross and Stirling Council areas.

Tactran was established as one of the Regional Transport Partnerships created as a result of the Transport (Scotland) Act 2005.

Functions

The Partnership consists of ten Councillors, representing the four local authorities in the region, and five non-Councillor members. In addition to the extensive community and local government experience that the Councillors contribute to the Partnership, the five non-Councillor members add significant expertise in a variety of fields including the bus industry, enterprise, engineering and financial management, health, the freight industry and sustainable transport.

Tactran's role is to bring together the local authorities and other key stakeholders to take a strategic approach to transport planning and delivery in the region. Tactran has developed a Regional Transport Strategy that sets out a Vision and Objectives over a 10-15-year period for meeting the transport needs of people and businesses throughout the region.

Tactran has also produced a Regional Travel Plan Strategy and Workplace Travel Plan Toolkit to help major employers in the region promote more sustainable travel choices, including a car share website. Tactran has also developed a website specific to travel planning which assists employers in the process.

References

External links
 

Transport in Scotland
Regional Transport Partnerships in Scotland